The Men's pursuit event of the Biathlon World Championships 2015 was held on 8 March 2015. The fastest 60 athletes of the sprint competition participated over a course of 12.5 km.

Results
The race was started at 14:15 EET.

References

Men's pursuit